Jonathan Trumbull Howe (born August 24, 1935) is a retired four-star United States Navy admiral, and was the Special Representative for Somalia to United Nations Secretary-General Boutros Boutros-Ghali from March 9, 1993, succeeding Ismat Kittani from Iraq, until his resignation in February 1994. During his time in Somalia he oversaw UNOSOM II operations including the 'Bloody Monday' raid which killed dozens and was a decisive turning point in the UNSOM II mission.

Howe was also the former Deputy National Security Advisor in the first Bush Administration. He currently is Executive Director of The Arthur Vining Davis Foundations.

Early life and education
Howe is a 1957 graduate of the United States Naval Academy, and earned Master of Arts, Master of Arts in Law and Diplomacy, and Doctor of Philosophy degrees from the Fletcher School of Law and Diplomacy at Tufts University from 1968 to 1969.

Naval service
His other assignments include Military Assistant to the Assistant to the President for National Security Affairs (1969–1974), Assistant to the Vice President for National Security Affairs (1975–1977), Chief of Staff of the Seventh Fleet in Yokosuka, Japan (1978–1980), Senior Military Assistant to the Deputy Secretary of Defense from 1981 to 1982, Director of the State Department's Bureau of Political-Military Affairs from 1982 to 1984, Deputy Chairman, NATO Military Committee, Brussels, Belgium (1986–1987), Assistant to the Chairman of the Joint Chiefs of Staff (1987–1989). From May 1989 he served simultaneously as Commander in Chief, Allied Forces Southern Europe and Commander, United States Naval Forces Europe. Following that assignment, he was named Deputy Assistant to the President for National Security Affairs by President George H. W. Bush in 1991, succeeding Robert M. Gates when he moved on to become CIA director. He retired from the United States Navy in 1992.

During his time as Deputy Assistant he was directly involved in the pursuit of President Manuel Noriega of Panama.

Service in Somalia and the Bloody Monday attack

In 1992, Howe was selected by the Clinton Administration to head UNOSOM II - the UN operation in Somalia that took over from the US in May in what was described by one American official as "the miscasting of the century." In this capacity he came under criticism for hiding away from the action in his fortified bunker, and for his pursuit of Somali military leader Mohamed Farrah Aidid, which was called a "personal vendetta."

On July 12, 1993, Howe oversaw the event Somalis call Bloody Monday. According to American war correspondent Scott Peterson a group of Somali elders had gathered at a house to discuss a way to make peace to end the violence between Somali militias and the UN forces. The gathering had been publicized in Somali newspapers the day before the attack as a peace gathering. After being tipped off by an undercover operative, American Cobra attack helicopters launched TOW Missiles and 20 mm caliber cannon fire at the structure. According to a Somali survivor, American ground troops killed 15 survivors at close range with pistols, a charge American commanders deny. According to the International Committee of the Red Cross there were over 200 Somali casualties. Four Western journalists were killed at the scene by Somalis following the attacks.

Howe claimed that the mission took out a "very key terrorist planning cell" and that no civilians were killed. He stated "we knew what we were hitting. It was well planned." The event is considered a turning point in the war as Somalis turned from wanting peace to wanting revenge, ultimately leading to the Black Hawk Down Incident. Human Rights Watch declared that the attack "looked like mass murder."

Personal life
Howe is author of the 1971 book Multicrises: Seapower and Global Politics in the Missile Age.

Admiral Howe was married to Dr. Harriet Mangrum Howe, whom he met in high school; her father, Richard C. Mangrum, was a U.S. Marine Corps general and served as Assistant Commandant of the Marine Corps and his father, Hamilton W. Howe, was a Navy Admiral. She was an Assistant Professor of Sociology at the University of North Florida.

Admiral Howe has six grown children, and currently resides in Florida.

Awards and decorations
On January 13, 1993, after retirement, he received the National Security Medal.

  Navy Surface Warfare Officer insignia
  Silver SSBN Deterrent Patrol insignia with six gold stars 
  Defense Distinguished Service Medal with one silver oak leaf cluster
  Navy Distinguished Service Medal with one gold award star
  Defense Superior Service Medal
  Legion of Merit with two award stars
  National Security Medal
  National Defense Service Medal with two bronze service stars
  Navy Sea Service Deployment Ribbon with service star
  Navy and Marine Corps Overseas Service Ribbon

Notes

External links
Interview with Admiral Howe about Somalia

1935 births
Living people
United States Navy admirals
United States Naval Academy alumni
Recipients of the Legion of Merit
The Fletcher School at Tufts University alumni
Battle of Mogadishu (1993)
Recipients of the Defense Superior Service Medal
Recipients of the Defense Distinguished Service Medal
Recipients of the Navy Distinguished Service Medal
United States Deputy National Security Advisors